Zib, ZiB, or ZIB my refer to:

People 
 Lukas Zib (born 1977), Czech ice hockey player
 Tomáš Zíb (born 1976), Czech tennis player

Science and technology 
 Zebibyte (ZiB), a large unit of digital information storage
 Zebibit (Zib), a unit of digital information storage
 Zinc-ion battery, rechargeable battery technology

Other 
 An alternate transliteration for al-Zeeb, a Palestinian village depopulated in the lead up to and during the 1948 Arab-Israeli War
 Soviet space dog, ZIB, a passenger on a sub-orbital flight in 1951
 Zeit im Bild, an Austrian news television broadcast
 Zimbabwean sign languages (ISO 639-3 code)
 Zuse Institute Berlin, a research institute for applied mathematics and computer science